Comanche is a 1956 American Western film directed by George Sherman in CinemaScope and starring Dana Andrews. The film has a theme song "A Man Is As Good As His Word" sung by The Lancers.

Plot
In 1875, near Durango, Mexico, a group of renegade Comanche attack a peaceful village and kidnap the daughter of a Spanish aristocrat. They escape the Mexican Army by crossing into US territory. Jim Read (Dana Andrews), a frontier scout, is sent to investigate and ease tensions between the Mexicans and the Comanche. But long standing hatred and the profitable business of scalp-hunting does not help in resolving the conflict. Read is sent to negotiate with the Comanche chief, Quanah (Kent Smith). Whilst searching for Quanah, Read sees Art Downey (Stacy Harris), a local scalp-hunter, shoot and injure a Comanche. Read rescues him and takes him to Quanah. Read however is himself accused of the shooting by Black Cloud (Henry Brandon), the renegade leader, until the injured brave recovers enough to clear his name. Read reveals to Quanah that they are cousins and that his mother was the sister of Quanah's mother. Quanah swears loyalty to his white friend. Read leaves to fetch government officials to  a peace council, but discovers a cavalry detachment that has been massacred by Black Cloud and his renegades. The Government official, Commissioner Ward (Lowell Gilmore), has ordered the cavalry to subdue the Indians, by force if necessary. Black Cloud attacks a column of cavalry troopers and captures Ward. Quanah and a large force of loyal Comanche intervene and threaten to attack Black Cloud. Vengeful Black Cloud kills Ward. In the ensuing battle, Read kills Downey and Black Cloud and peace is restored.

Cast
 Dana Andrews as Jim Read
 Kent Smith as Quanah Parker
 Nestor Paiva as Puffer
 Henry Brandon as Black Cloud
 Stacy Harris as Downey
 John Litel as Gen. Nelson A. Miles
 Lowell Gilmore as Commissioner Ward
 Mike Mazurki as Flat Mouth
 Tony Carbajal as Little Snake
 Linda Cristal as Margarita
 Reed Sherman as Lt. French
 Iron Eyes Cody as Medicine Arrow, the medicine man

Production
Writer-producer Carl Krueger spent five to six years researching the story. He says he was offered up to $30,000 for the script but held out to make it independently as he wanted the film shot in Mexico.

Reception
The film received some good reviews with the location work in Durango, Mexico much praised.  TV Guide and the Radio Times both rated it two out of four stars, each citing it as interesting mostly for introducing Cristal to North American audiences.

References

External links
 
 
 
 

1956 films
1956 Western (genre) films
American Western (genre) films
Western (genre) cavalry films
American Indian Wars films

CinemaScope films
1950s English-language films
Films directed by George Sherman
Films scored by Herschel Burke Gilbert
Films set in 1875
Films set in Mexico
Films set in the United States
Films shot in Mexico
United Artists films
1950s American films